Amorbia revolutana is a species of moth of the family Tortricidae. It is found in Ecuador, Bolivia, Costa Rica, Cuba, Panama and Venezuela.

The length of the forewings is 7.5–8.9 mm for males and 11.9–13 mm for females. The ground colour of the forewings is light brown with the basal, median, and subterminal fasciae and apex darker. The hindwings are pale brown. Adults have been recorded on wing nearly year round.

The larvae have been recorded feeding on Rubiaceae and Piperaceae species (including Piper auritum). They are green with a tan to reddish head.

References

Moths described in 1877
Sparganothini
Moths of North America
Moths of South America